Francis T. Maloney High School is a public school located in Meriden, Connecticut.  The student body makeup is 51 percent male and 49 percent female, and the total minority enrollment is 64 percent. Francis T. Maloney High School is 1 of 2 high schools in the Meriden School District.

Maloney athletics are very well known throughout Meriden as an annual Thanksgiving football game against the cross-town rival Platt Panthers, which they are now ranked Class L, gains media attention all over the city and has upwards of 2000 people attending the game. The school's boys basketball team won the Class L CIAC championship against Lyman Hall of Wallingford on March 15, 2008. This was the first boys' basketball state title for Maloney. The schools athletic program also has produced Jonathan Jenkins, a defensive lineman currently playing professionally for the Miami Dolphins.

Notable alumni

 Beau Billingslea, Actor
 Rob Hyman, Musician
 John Jenkins, NFL player
 Jay Murphy, Former NBA Player
 Jennifer DiNoia, American Singer and Stage Actress

References

Buildings and structures in Meriden, Connecticut
Schools in New Haven County, Connecticut
Public high schools in Connecticut